Spipiyus Provincial Park is a 2,979 hectare provincial park in British Columbia, Canada.  Also known as the Caren Range, Spipiyus Park is north of Halfmoon Bay on the Sechelt Peninsula.  It protects pockets of old-growth forest, prime habitat for the marbled murrelet.  There are hiking trails that lead to Mount Hallowell with views of the islands and fjords of Pender Harbour, the Strait of Georgia and Vancouver Island.

External links

BC Parks Webpage

Provincial parks of British Columbia
Sunshine Coast Regional District
Protected areas established in 1999
1999 establishments in British Columbia